Andy McCall may refer to:

Andy McCall (footballer, born 1911) (1911–1979), Scottish football player
Andy McCall (footballer, born 1925) (1925–2014), Scottish football player